The William L. Hurst Law Office, on N. Washington Street in Campton, Kentucky, is a historic brick building built around 1887.  It was listed on the National Register of Historic Places in 1993.

It includes elements of Italianate and also of Classical Revival architecture.

It was used as law offices by William L. Hurst, a Union veteran of the Civil War, who moved to the area in the 1870s and practiced law into the 1900s.  Hurst rented the building to the city of Campton for use as a sheriff and clerk's office during 1914–1917.

See also 
 Henry Clay's Law Office: NRHP listing in Lexington, Kentucky
 McConnell House, Law Office, and Slave Quarters: NRHP listing in Greenup County, Kentucky
 National Register of Historic Places listings in Wolfe County, Kentucky

References

Commercial buildings on the National Register of Historic Places in Kentucky
Italianate architecture in Kentucky
Commercial buildings completed in 1887
National Register of Historic Places in Wolfe County, Kentucky
1887 establishments in Kentucky
Legal history of Kentucky
Law offices